Kaarel Eenpalu (until 1935 Karl August Einbund) (in Paju talu, Vesneri Parish (now Tartu Parish), Kreis Dorpat, Governorate of Livonia, Russian Empire – 27 January 1942, in Kirov Oblast, Russian SFSR, USSR) was an Estonian journalist, politician and head of state, who served as 7th Prime Minister of Estonia.

Education 
Eenpalu was educated at the Hugo Treffner Gymnasium in Tartu. Between 1909 and 1914 he studied law at Tartu University and later graduated from Moscow University.

Journalism 
From 1910 to 1912 and in 1915 he was member of the editorial board of the Postimees ("The Postman") daily in Tartu, in 1918 editor of Postimees, in 1920 editor-in-chief of Tallinna Teataja ("The Tallinn Gazette") daily, and in 1924 editor-in-chief of the Kaja ("Echo") newspaper.

War 

Eenpalu was active in World War I, serving as a battery commander in the First Estonian Artillery Regiment in 1917 and 1918. During the Estonian War of Independence in 1918–1919, he first commanded the Tartu High School students' battalion, and then a battery in the Second Estonian Artillery Regiment.

Political career 
Eenpalu was a member of the Estonian Constituent Assembly (Asutav Kogu, 1919–1920), member of the unicameral parliament (Riigikogu, 1920–1937), member of the lower house (Riigivolikogu) of the bicameral parliament since 1938), and held a series of high government offices in the independent Republic of Estonia in 1918–1940. In 1919–1920 he was State Controller. In 1920, 1921–1924, and 1924–1926 he held the position of the Minister of Internal Affairs, and can thus be considered a founder of the Estonian Police. From 22 June 1926 to 19 July 1932 and from 18 May 1933 to 29 August 1934 he was Speaker of the III, IV and V Riigikogu. From 19 July to 1 November 1932 he was the head of state (Riigivanem, literally "Elder of State"). In 1934–1938 he was again Minister of Internal Affairs, and in 1938–1939 he was the Prime Minister of Estonia.

Capture 
After the Soviet Union occupied Estonia on 17 June 1940, Eenpalu, along with a number of other leading Estonian politicians, was arrested in July 1940 and subsequently deported to Russia. He died in 1942 in a Soviet prison camp in Vyatka (Vyatlag), Kirov (Vyatka) Oblast.

Awards
 1927 – Order of the Estonian Red Cross I/II
 1930 – Order of the Cross of the Eagle I
 1935 – Order of the Estonian Red Cross I/I
 1938 – Order of the White Star I
 1939 – Order of the National Coat of Arms I

Personal
Kaarel Eenpalu was married to women's activist Linda Eenpalu. They had three daughters: Helmi-Aino (1917), Virve (1919), Tiiu-Hilja (1921) and Mai-Linda (1923). Politician Anne Eenpalu (born 1954) is Kaarel Eenpalu's granddaughter.

Notes

References

                                         
 

1888 births
1942 deaths
People from Tartu Parish
People from Kreis Dorpat
Estonian People's Party politicians
Farmers' Assemblies politicians
Patriotic League (Estonia) politicians
Heads of State of Estonia
Prime Ministers of Estonia
Ministers of the Interior of Estonia
Members of the Estonian Constituent Assembly
Members of the Riigikogu, 1920–1923
Members of the Riigikogu, 1923–1926
Members of the Riigikogu, 1926–1929
Members of the Riigikogu, 1929–1932
Members of the Riigikogu, 1932–1934
Speakers of the Riigikogu
Members of the Estonian National Assembly
Members of the Riigivolikogu
Estonian journalists
20th-century journalists
Hugo Treffner Gymnasium alumni
University of Tartu alumni
Moscow State University alumni
Russian military personnel of World War I
Estonian military personnel of the Estonian War of Independence
Recipients of the Order of the National Coat of Arms, 1st Class
Recipients of the Military Order of the Cross of the Eagle, Class I
Recipients of the Order of the White Star, 1st Class
Recipients of the Order of the Three Stars
Estonian people who died in prison custody
Estonian people who died in Soviet detention
People who died in the Gulag